Murray Dimble (8 December, 1922 – 24 August, 2003) was an Australian rules footballer who played with Essendon and St Kilda in the Victorian Football League (VFL).

Notes

External links 		
		
		
		
		
		

1922 births
2003 deaths
Australian rules footballers from Victoria (Australia)
Essendon Football Club players
St Kilda Football Club players